Poljana is a village near Lipik, Croatia.

References

Populated places in Požega-Slavonia County
Lipik